Randall Andre Milligan (born November 27, 1961) is a former American Professional Baseball first baseman who played from 1987 to 1994.  He is currently a scout with the Baltimore Orioles of the Major League Baseball (MLB). Milligan is nicknamed "Moose".

In 1987, Milligan won the International League batting title with a .326 BA and was tops in runs scored with 99 and in RBIs with 103. His 29 home runs ranked third in the league, missing the Triple Crown by two home runs. He was the league's MVP, Rookie of the Year, and All-Star first baseman.

Milligan's game-winning double scoring Cal Ripken Jr. on June 17, 1991, is shown in the Oscar-nominated movie A Few Good Men.

References

External links

1961 births
Living people
African-American baseball players
American expatriate baseball players in Canada
American expatriate baseball players in Mexico
Baltimore Orioles players
Baltimore Orioles scouts
Baseball players from San Diego
Buffalo Bisons (minor league) players
Cincinnati Reds players
Cleveland Indians players
Guerreros de Oaxaca players
International League MVP award winners
Jackson Mets players
Lynchburg Mets players
Major League Baseball first basemen
Montreal Expos players
New York Mets players
New York Mets scouts
Pittsburgh Pirates players
Shelby Mets players
Tidewater Tides players
21st-century African-American people
20th-century African-American sportspeople